Son Castelló is a station of the Palma Metro in Palma on the island of Majorca, Spain.

The underground station, which opened 25 April 2007, is located at the southern end of Gran Via Asima in the Son Castelló industrial area, from which it takes its name.

References

Palma Metro stations
Railway stations in Spain opened in 2007